Rayne Fisher-Quann (born August 9, 2001) is a Canadian writer and culture critic.

Activism
In September 2018, Fisher-Quann created the student organization March for Our Education in order to lead student actions to protest Ontario Premier Doug Ford's decision to repeal the sex education content of the provincial Health and Physical Education curriculum, cancel a proposed Indigenous-focused curriculum, and enact other funding cuts to education. The first student rally took place in Queen's Park in Toronto, Ontario on July 21, 2018. In September 2018, Fisher-Quann co-organized another day of action with fellow student and activist Indygo Arscott from Decolonize Our Schools. Using the hashtags #WeTheStudentsDoConsent, #StudentsSayYes and #FreeTheStudents, students organized across social media leading to student walkouts and rallies across Ontario on September 20, 21 and 22, 2018. In April 2019, Fisher-Quann and March for Our Education helped to register schools for another province-wide student walkout against government cuts to education organized by Ontario high school student Natalie Moore.

Following the student protests, Fisher-Quann was a featured speaker at the 2019 Toronto Women's March in January 2019. She was also a keynote speaker at a UNICEF Canada youth activism summit on November 20, 2019.

Education 
Fisher-Quann attended high school at William Lyon Mackenzie Collegiate Institute in Toronto, Ontario and was a student at the University of British Columbia.

References 

Youth activists
2001 births
Living people
Sex education advocates